The Rural Municipality of Kelvington No. 366 is a rural municipality (RM) in the Canadian province of Saskatchewan within Census Division No. 14 and  Division No. 4. It is located in the southeast portion of the province.

History 
The RM of Kelvington No. 366 incorporated as a rural municipality on January 1, 1913.

Geography

Communities and localities 
The following urban municipalities are surrounded by the RM.

Villages
Kelvington

It also surrounds the Yellow Quill 90 First Nations Indian reserve.

Demographics 

Government 
The RM of Kelvington No. 366 is governed by an elected municipal council and an appointed administrator that meets on the second Thursday of every month. The reeve of the RM is Maurice Patenaude while its administrator is Heather Elmy. The RM's office is located in Kelvington.

References 

K

Division No. 14, Saskatchewan